Ronald D. Sugar (born July 30, 1948) is an American business executive. He served as the chairman of the board and chief executive officer of the Northrop Grumman Corporation from 2003 to 2009. On August 1, 2018 he was unanimously elected as independent Chairman of Uber.

Early life
Ronald D. Sugar was born on July 30, 1948. He received a PhD in electrical engineering from UCLA in 1971 after he graduated summa cum laude in engineering from the University of California, Los Angeles in 1968.

Career
Sugar served as the president and chief operating officer of TRW Aerospace and Information Systems. From 2000 to 2001, he served as the president and chief operating officer of Litton Industries. He then served as the president and chief operating officer of Northrop Grumman Corporation from 2001 to 2003, and as its chairman and CEO from 2003 to 2009. He was succeeded by Wesley G. Bush.

Sugar has also been a director of Chevron Corporation since 2005 and Apple Inc. since 2010.

Awards and honors
Sugar was elected a member of the National Academy of Engineering for major contributions to advanced space communication systems and leadership in innovative aerospace programs.

Philanthropy
He is a member of the Board of Trustees of the University of Southern California.

See also
Outline of Apple Inc. (personnel)
History of Apple Inc.

References

American people of Canadian descent
Directors of Chevron Corporation
Northrop Grumman people
UCLA Henry Samueli School of Engineering and Applied Science alumni
1948 births
Living people
Directors of Apple Inc.
American corporate directors
Canadian corporate directors
Canadian chief executives
American chief operating officers
Directors of Uber